This list of Ports and harbours in Madagascar details the ports, harbours around the coast of Madagascar.

List of ports and harbours in Madagascar

External links

References

Ports

Madagascar